Liladhar  or  Lila Dhar  is an Indian name and may refer to:

Liladhar Dake, Indian politician
Liladhar Joshi, Indian politician
Liladhar Kotoki, Indian politician
Liladhar Vaghela, Indian politician
Lila Dhar Barooah, Indian politician